The Voice of Germany (season 3) is a German reality talent show that premiered on 17 October 2013 on ProSieben and Sat.1. Based on the reality singing competition The Voice of Holland, the series was created by Dutch television producer John de Mol. It is part of an international series.
Xavier Naidoo and Rea Garvey have been replaced with Max Herre and Samu Haber, singer of the Finnish pop-rock band Sunrise Avenue. This season adopted the Knockout round as seen in the US version of The Voice.

On 20 December 2013, Andreas Kümmert was declared the winner of the season marking Max Herre's first and only win as a coach and the first new coach to win on his first attempt.

The first phase: The Blind Auditions

Episode 1: October 17, 2013

Episode 2: October 18, 2013

Episode 3: October 24, 2013

Episode 4: October 25, 2013

Episode 5: October 31, 2013

Episode 6: November 1, 2013

The second phase: The Battle Rounds 

For this first time, this series will see the Steal Deal where eliminated contestants can be stolen by other coaches.

 Key
  – Coach hit his/her "I WANT YOU" button
  – Artist defaulted to this coaches team
  – Artist elected to join this coaches team
  – Battle winner
  – Battle loser
  - Battle loser but was saved by another coach

Episode 7: November 7, 2013

Episode 8: November 8, 2013

Episode 9: November 14, 2013

Episode 10: November 15, 2013

The third phase: The Showdown Round

Two contestants sing an individual song and the coach decides which contestant will advance to the Live Shows.

Color key:

Episode 11: November 21, 2013

Episode 12: November 22, 2013

Episode 13: November 28, 2013

The fourth phase: The Live shows
The live shows started on 29 November 2013 and concluded with the Final on 20 December 2013. All Live shows were broadcast on Sat.1. In the first two live shows the six remaining contestants of every team were split in groups of three. After all the contestants in each group had sung their individual songs, the responsible coach had to award 20, 30 & 50 points to these contestants. After this a televoting had been held, which made up 50% of voting. The contestant with the most points advanced to final.

In the Semifinal and Final the coach didn't vote and only the public decided who will advance and win The voice of Germany 2013.

Episode 14: November 29, 2013

Episode 15: December 6, 2013

Episode 16 (Semifinal): December 13, 2013
The semifinal saw the introduction of "The Cross-Battles". Two contestant of different teams sing an individual song. The contestant with the most public votes advances to the final. After the announcement of the finalist, the winning contestant sang his winning song. All songs, also the ones which were not presented live, were released on iTunes. Every download counted as two phone calls from the public in the final voting.

Episode 17 (Final): December 20, 2013

Elimination Chart

Overall 
Color key
Artist's info

Result details

Ratings

References

External links
 Official website on ProSieben.de
 The Voice of Germany on fernsehserien.de

2013 German television seasons
3